Benjamin Franklin Keith (January 26, 1846 – March 26, 1914) was an American vaudeville theater owner, highly influential in the evolution of variety theater into vaudeville.

Biography

Early years
Keith was born in Hillsboro Bridge, New Hampshire. He joined the circus (as a "candy butcher") after attending Van Amburg's Circus and then worked at Bunnell's Museum in New York City in the early 1860s. He later joined P.T. Barnum and then joined the Forepaugh Circus, before he opened a curio museum in Boston, in 1883, with Colonel William Austin. In 1885 he joined Edward Franklin Albee II, who was selling circus tickets and operating the Boston Bijou Theatre. Their opening show was on July 6, 1885. The theatre was one of the early adopters of the continuous variety show which ran from 10:00 in the morning until 11:00 at night, every day. Previously, shows ran at fixed intervals with several hours of downtime between shows. With the continuous show, you could enter the theatre at any time, and stay until you reached the point in the show where you arrived. Attractions included "The Circassian Beauties".

Moving pictures
Albee and Keith opened the Union Square Theatre in New York City, and it was the site of the first American exhibition of the Lumière Cinématographe. They had obtained the exclusive American rights to the Lumière apparatus and their film output, and the first showing was on June 29, 1896. They then opened theatres in Philadelphia, and Boston, and then smaller theatres in the East and Midwest of the United States, buying out rival smaller chains. They signed a contract with Biograph Studios in 1896 which lasted until July 1905 when they switched to Edison Studios as their supplier of motion pictures. Keith and Albee merged their theatre circuit with Frederick Freeman Proctor in June 1906.

Death
Keith withdrew from business in 1909 and married for a second time on October 29, 1913, to Ethel Bird Chase (1887-1971). She was 26 years old and Keith was 67. Her father was P. B. Chase.

Keith died at the Breakers Hotel in Palm Beach, Florida in 1914. After his son, Andrew Keith, died in 1918, control of the company went to Albee.

Legacy
In 1928, the B. F. Keith Circuit merged with the Orpheum Circuit to form the Keith-Albee-Orpheum (KAO) corporation in Marysville, Washington. In a few months, this organization became the major motion picture studio Radio-Keith-Orpheum (RKO). Also in 1928 the B.F. Keith Memorial Theatre opened in Boston. Keith Academy and Keith Hall in Lowell, Massachusetts were named for his family in 1926. His son A. Paul Keith had donated family money to Cardinal William O'Connell.

Timeline
1846 Birth in Hillsboro Bridge, New Hampshire on January 26
1883 Partnered with Colonel William Austin in Boston
1885 Partnered with Edward Franklin Albee II
1894 Opens Keith's Theatre in Boston
1896 Opens Union Square Theatre in New York City
1906 Partnered with Frederick Freeman Proctor
1909 Retires
1913 Marriage to Ethel Bird Chase (1887-1971)
1914 Death in Palm Beach, Florida on March 26
1918 Death of his son Andrew Keith (c1870-1918)
1928 His company merges with Orpheum Circuit, Inc. on January 28

References

Further reading

External links

Benjamin Franklin Keith at IMDb

1846 births
1914 deaths
People from Hillsborough, New Hampshire
Vaudeville producers
Film exhibitors